Iassus is a genus of leafhoppers in the family Cicadellidae. There are more than 35 described species in Iassus, located primarily in Europe.

Species

 Iassus bohemani Metcalf, 1966
 Iassus chortophilus Walker, 1851
 Iassus costalis Walker, 1870
 Iassus epirrhaena Walker, 1851
 Iassus extremus Walker, 1852
 Iassus flavipes Motschulsky, 1859
 Iassus hyalinus Palisot de Beauvois, 1820
 Iassus hypaulacius Walker, 1851
 Iassus infectoriae Abdul-Nour, 1998
 Iassus iziaslavi Anufriev, 1977
 Iassus lanio (Linnaeus, 1761)
 Iassus lateralis Matsumura, 1905
 Iassus leucospilus Walker, 1851
 Iassus lineola Walker, 1858
 Iassus lunatus Statz, 1950
 Iassus melanoneurus Heer, 1853
 Iassus mirabilis Orosz, 1979
 Iassus multisparsus Jacobi, 1917
 Iassus muscarius Heer, 1853
 Iassus nacia Walker, 1851
 Iassus osborni Metcalf, 1966
 Iassus pedematia Walker, 1851
 Iassus pellucidus Osborn, 1934
 Iassus peltophlyctis Walker, 1851
 Iassus prostictops Walker, 1851
 Iassus pseudocerris Abdul-Nour, 1998
 Iassus pulcher Piton, 1940
 Iassus ranjiti Ghosh, 1974
 Iassus robustus Statz, 1950
 Iassus scutellaris Fieber, 1868
 Iassus sepultus Meunier, 1920
 Iassus sujfunus Anufriev, 1971
 Iassus tetrops Jacobi, 1917
 Iassus ulmi Kusnezov, 1929
 Iassus xantholues Walker, 1851
 Iassus zinnevia Walker, 1851
 †Iassus lapidescens Scudder, 1877

References

External links

 

Cicadellidae genera
Iassinae